Sadayoshia is a genus of 14 species of squat lobsters in the family Munididae.

Species

Sadayoshia acamar Macpherson & Baba, 2012
Sadayoshia acroporae Baba, 1972
Sadayoshia actaea Macpherson & Baba, 2012
Sadayoshia adaro Macpherson & Baba, 2012
Sadayoshia aludra Macpherson & Baba, 2012
Sadayoshia balica (Boone, 1935)
Sadayoshia edwardsii (Miers, 1884)
Sadayoshia inermis Macpherson & Baba, 2010
Sadayoshia latisternata Macpherson & Baba, 2010
Sadayoshia lipkei Macpherson & Baba, 2010
Sadayoshia miyakei Baba, 1969
Sadayoshia moorei Macpherson & Baba, 2012
Sadayoshia savali Macpherson & Baba, 2012
Sadayoshia tenuirostris Macpherson & Baba, 2010

References

External links

Squat lobsters